The women's 100 metre backstroke event at the 1964 Olympic Games took place between October 13 and 14. This swimming event used backstroke.  Because an Olympic-size swimming pool is 50 metres long, this race consisted of two lengths of the pool.

Medalists

Results

Heats
Heat 1

Heat 2

Heat 3

Heat 4

Final

Key: WR = World record

References

Women's backstroke 100 metre
1964 in women's swimming
Women's events at the 1964 Summer Olympics